Knut "Knutte" Nilsson (March 22, 1887 – ?) was a Swedish amateur football (soccer) and bandy player. He competed in the 1912 Summer Olympics. He was a member of the Swedish Olympic squad. He did not play in a match, but was a reserve player.

References

External links

1887 births
1958 deaths
Swedish footballers
Swedish bandy players
Sweden international footballers
AIK Fotboll players
AIK Bandy players
Olympic footballers of Sweden
Footballers at the 1912 Summer Olympics
Association football midfielders